The Vauxhall Velox is a six-cylinder executive car which was produced by Vauxhall from 1948 to 1965. The Velox was a large family car, directly competing in the UK with the contemporary six-cylinder Ford Zephyr, and to a slightly lesser extent, with the A90, A95, and A110 Austin Westminster models.

It was introduced by Vauxhall shortly before the London Motor Show in October 1948, as a successor to the Vauxhall Fourteen. Between 1948 and 1957 the Velox shared its body with the less-powerful four-cylinder Vauxhall Wyvern. From August 1954 through to October 1965, it shared its body with the more luxuriously equipped Vauxhall Cresta, a tradition that ended with the introduction of the new PC Vauxhalls. The Velox name was discontinued at that time in favour of the more upmarket Vauxhall Cresta name, while a new flagship model, the Vauxhall Viscount, was launched.

The Velox and its Opel contemporaries are remembered for having mirrored North American styling trends much more closely than other European models of the time. That was particularly apparent following the 1957 introduction of the PA version of the Velox.

Velox LIP & LBP (1948–51) 

Power was delivered to the rear wheels via a three-speed manual gear box with synchromesh on the top two ratios.

Optional extras included a heater from which warm air was evenly distributed between the front and back areas of the passenger cabin and which could be set to de-ice the windscreen in winter or to provide cool air ventilation in summer. Also available at extra charge was an AM radio integrated into the fascia.

The body was shared with the four-cylinder Vauxhall Wyvern, a pattern that continued with subsequent versions of the Velox until the introduction of the more compact Vauxhall Victor at the beginning of 1957. While the Velox exterior differed only in badging, additional brightwork and different coloured wheels, the interior boasted superior seating materials over the Wyvern including a central arm rest in the rear.

The test car cost £550 including taxes.

Foreign production
As well as being built at Vauxhall's Luton plant in England, early Velox and Wyvern models were assembled in Australia (by Holden in Melbourne) and in New Zealand at the GM plant in Petone, near Wellington. The LBP model ID was applied to "chassis only" exports to Australia, where local production included a two-door Caleche tourer and, in early four-door saloons, a unique "six-light" body featuring an additional rear window behind the back doors. This gave the car more resemblance from the rear to the pre-war designed J-series Vauxhall Fourteen it replaced (see accompanying illustration below).

Velox LIP production also took place in Switzerland, where a 400 kg van version (built by Geser of Lucerne) was a common sight in the 1950s serving as Swiss Post Office vehicles. Despite the lack of bumper over-riders suggesting the four-cylinder Wyvern powerplant, all vans were Veloxes. Conventional Velox and Wyvern four-door saloons were assembled at the General Motors plant at Biel.

Also built in Switzerland was a unique prototype two seater roadster known as the Vauxhall Zimmerli-Velox 18–6. This used a coach built aluminium body on a tubular ladder chassis, with standard Velox running gear. It was built in 1949 for the Zimmerli brothers, who had a Vauxhall dealership in Reiden. The car survives today in near original condition.

Velox EIP/EIPV & EBP (1951–57) 

In August 1951 a longer, wider Velox was launched, designated as the EIP series, and featuring a modern 'three box' shape and integral construction. The body was again shared with the 4-cylinder-engined Wyvern.

The test car cost £802 including taxes. In the same year, the magazine tested the similarly sized Ford Zephyr Six. Ford's test car was fitted with options including a radio, a heater and leather seating: thus equipped the Zephyr came with a recommended retail price of  £842.

In April 1952 the Velox was redesignated as the EIPV series, and received a new over-square 2262 cc engine which had been in the development pipeline for several years. This provided either   or, with a compression ratio improved to 7.6:1,  of power.

The test car cost had risen to £833 including taxes.

In December 1952 General Motors Holden launched a tourer and coupe utility version of the EIPV Velox and EIX Wyvern models on the Australian market, these cars' chassis were prefixed EBP for  the Velox and EBX for the Wyvern. Both these cars used modified Vauxhall bodies affixed to the Bedford CA chassis. The tourer was originally to be called the Caleche but by the time of launch the model name was changed to Vagabond. The Vagabond was a two-door five seater with folding top and side curtains. It did not survive the 1955 face lift. The coupe utility continued on (Velox only from 1955) until officially withdrawn at the end of the 1957 model year.

In August 1954 a significant facelift was applied. Most obvious of the many cosmetic changes was a new front grille and trafficators were replaced by flashing lights (red at the rear, US-style). More important was the introduction at this time of a sister model, branded as the Vauxhall Cresta. In addition to superior equipment levels, the Cresta was distinguished by a two tone paint finish.  The 1954 VELOX also differed from the 1953 which had a side opening bonnet, by having a front opening bonnet

Detroit was by now favouring annual facelifts, and Vauxhall reflected that trend, announcing further facelifts for 1956 (wind-up windows, larger rear window, wider grille slats, separate amber rear flashing indicator lights replacing US-style red units incorporated into the brake/tail light lens, new instrument graphics) and again for 1957 (electric wipers, larger tail lights, new grille, new 'magic ribbon' AC speedo) in line with the Wyvern model. Technically, however, there were no further changes until the arrival of a completely new Velox in October 1957.

In Australia, Holden built a quantity of utilities (pickup trucks) as well as the 2-door Vagabond Convertible based on the EIP Velox. These had a separate chassis - prefixed EBP - with the Australian bodies fitted to them. The Velox was also assembled at the General Motors New Zealand plant in Petone, north of Wellington, through to and including the PC Cresta of the late 1960s, by which time buyer favour had turned to the similarly sized GM-dealer stablemate from Australia, the Holden Belmont/Kingswood.

Velox PA (1957–62)

Velox PA S (1957–59) 
At the 1957 London Motor Show Vauxhall presented radically new Velox and Cresta models: these would come to be known as the PA versions, being the first of the P series.   Particularly eye catching was the new wrap-around windscreen; combined with a three part rear window it created an airy passenger cabin providing exceptional all round visibility, Like the Cresta on which it was based, the PA Velox took styling cues from the 1957 Buick Special.  The back of the Velox was graced by tail fins, a Detroit inspired trend already taken up by the car's Ford rival, and which would in the next two years be followed also by UK rival BMC, and such European competitors as Fiat, and Peugeot.  On the inside the new Velox also followed US practice of combining a front bench seat with a column-shift gear lever, continuing a trend that dates back to the first Velox models of 1948. Velox models were also assembled at the General Motors Holden plants throughout Australia, and the General Motors New Zealand plant in Petone, north of Wellington. The Wyvern was replaced by the new Victor model line which was also built in the New Zealand plant. Specially engineered versions of the Velox were built for use by the NZ Traffic Police.

Minor modifications to the car's six-cylinder engine raised power output to 83 bhp (61 kW).   As before, the Cresta was distinguished from the Velox model by superior levels of equipment and also a two-tone paint finish.

Velox PA SY (1959–60) 
The Velox PA received its first facelift in October 1959 when the front grill was enlarged and the three-piece rear window was replaced by a single wrap-around window.  Technical improvements had to await the 1960 facelift, however.

Velox PA SX (1960–62) 
The October 1960 facelift for 1961 was marked by further modifications to the trim, new rear lights with modified tail fins (no longer with indicators built in), combined front park/indicator lamps and a new dashboard with the two round dials replaced by a rectangular cluster with "magic ribbon" speedometer – the strip indicating speed changed from green to amber at 30 mph and to red at 60 mph. There was also a new engine, still of six cylinders, but now increased in capacity to 2651 cc, and delivering . Velox models were also assembled at the General Motors New Zealand plant in Petone with special versions again built for local traffic police.

PA five-door estate models, converted by Friary of Basingstoke, were also available.

In their 1961–62 forms, the Velox and its Cresta sibling continued without further significant changes until replaced towards the end of 1962. For 1962, the painted dashboard gave way to simulated wood, the ashtray was moved from an in-dash drawer to the dashtop, wipers were lengthened to overlap slightly, a horn ring was added to the Velox steering wheel and there were minor instrument cluster changes to increase the size of warning lights.

Velox PB (1962–65) 

The final version of the Velox, launched along with the Cresta PB at the London Motor Show in October 1962, was well over four and a half metres long: it was the largest Velox ever built, longer and wider than the benchmark Ford Zephyr with which it competed in the UK. Taking its cues from the Victor FB introduced the previous year (and sharing the doors of the smaller car), the new car was stylistically more restrained than its flamboyant predecessor, the removal of vertical fins emphasizing the car's width.

In October 1964 the Velox PB became available with a more powerful 3294 cc engine. This made it one of the fastest European saloons of its day. The 2.6 was retained for some export markets in which government tax thresholds penalised buyers and users of cars with engine sizes above 2800 cc. The update also included a new full-width grille, new tail lights incorporating optional reversing lights, twin rear exhaust pipes, 120 mph speedometer (was 110), new interior trim and, towards the end of the run, a switch from three-speed Hydramatic (PNDSLR selector) to two-speed Powerglide (PRNDL). PB Velox models were again assembled at the General Motors New Zealand plant in Petone and special versions were again built for local traffic police. The 3.3 was particularly popular with these government customers.

October 1965 saw the introduction of the Vauxhall Cresta PC, equipped with that same 3294 cc engine.  This time no Velox version was offered.  Rather, the Cresta itself became the base model, with two headlights, complemented by the more luxurious Cresta Deluxe, with four headlights, and the vinyl roof Vauxhall Viscount with more luxurious trim and power windows.

References

Velox
Rear-wheel-drive vehicles
Sedans
Station wagons
1950s cars
1960s cars
Cars introduced in 1948
Cars discontinued in 1965
Police vehicles
Executive cars